Antonio Ordoñez-Plaja (1919–2012) was a Colombian surgeon, sociologist, politician and United Nations official. He served as Minister of Public Health in the Government of Colombia from 1966 to 1970 and as Chairman of UNICEF at the international level from 1976 to 1977.

He was a Professor of Anatomy and Physiology and later of Interdisciplinary Studies at the Pontifical Xavierian University. He also held visiting professorships at Yale University and the Harvard School of Public Health.

References

Colombian surgeons
Colombian politicians
Chairmen and Presidents of UNICEF
1919 births
2012 deaths
Colombian officials of the United Nations
Government ministers of Colombia
Spanish emigrants to Colombia
Colombian expatriates in the United States